The Abbey of San Magnus (it:Abbazia di San Magno di Fondi) is a monastery and church at the base of Monte Arcano, outside of the town of Fondi in the province of Latina, region of Lazio, Italy.

History
According to a history by the Pope and Saint Gregory the Great, a Benedictine monastery was erected in 522 by the abbot and Saint Honoratus of Fondi and dedicated to St Magnus, putatively an early second century Christian martyr.

The site was never free of the turmoil of the early medieval period. In 847, during the sack of the town of Fondi, the captain Plato of Veroli looted the relics of San Magnus and moved to them to a church of Sant'Andrea in Veroli. Putatively during a Saracen raid of Veroli, the remains were moved to Anagni.

In 1072, the monastery was donated to the Abbey of Montecassino; however in 1492, the pope Alexander VI transferred the monastery to the Olivetan order. In the 15th century under the patronage of Prospero Colonna, the abbey was almost entirely rebuilt. The layout of the original church remains, as does the Romanesque-style crypt. The apse and transept contain remains of 12th-century frescoes. Further damage to the structure was performed during the French occupation of 1797. The structure belongs today to the archdiocese of Gaeta, and is under restoration.

References

Bibliography 
 Nicoletta Cassieri e Daniela Quadrino, Fondi. S. Magno, loc. Divinité inconnue / monastère, in C. Ferrante, J.-C. Lacam, D. Quadrino (ed.), Fana, templa, delubra. Corpus dei luoghi di culto dell'Italia antica (FTD), 4, Regio I. Fondi, Formia, Minturno, Ponza, Roma 2015, pp. 24–28

External links 
 Official website of the Fraternità Monastero di San Magno
 Comune of Fondi

Benedictine monasteries in Italy
Monasteries in Lazio
Renaissance architecture in Lazio
Churches in the province of Latina